Mike Blabac is an American photographer who has extensively photographed skateboarding since the mid-90s. As of 2009, Mike is the director of skateboarding photography for DC Shoes and also regularly contributed to Transworld Skateboarding.

References

External links
 5 PHOTOS WITH MIKE BLABAC – 2018

Skate photographers
Living people
Year of birth missing (living people)